James Caven Mahaffy (August 29, 1905 – November 29, 1986) was a provincial level politician from Alberta, Canada. He served as a member of the Legislative Assembly of Alberta from 1940 to 1944. Mahaffy held a seat in the electoral district of Calgary as an Independent. Mahaffy briefly served as Leader of the Opposition.

Political career
Mahaffy ran for a seat in the 1940 Alberta general election. He was elected to the third seat in the Calgary electoral district as an Independent under the Alberta Unity Movement.

He briefly served as Leader of the Opposition during the 3rd Session of the 9th Alberta Legislative Assembly.

Mahaffy did not run for a second term in 1944.

References

External links
Legislative Assembly of Alberta Members Listing

Independent Alberta MLAs
1986 deaths
1905 births